Naa Mechida Huduga is a 1972 Kannada romantic drama film directed and scripted by R. N. Jayagopal. It is based on the story Divorce In Indian Style written by P. S. Vaidyanathan.

The film starred Srinath, Kalpana, K. S. Ashwath and Leelavathi in lead roles. The music composed by Vijaya Bhaskar was widely appreciated and declared chart-busters. The film was remade in Tamil as Kattila Thottila.

Cast 
 Kalpana as Pramila
 K. S. Ashwath as Bhaskar Rao, Pramila's father and an advocate
 Leelavathi as Leelavathi, Pramila's mother and a doctor
 Srinath as N. Gopinath "Gopi" Rao
 R. Nagendra Rao as N. G. Rao, Gopi's father
 Ramesh as Sundar, Bhaskar Rao's subordinate
 Shivaram as Shankar, Leelavathi's subordinate
 Vadiraj as Prasad, Pramila's brother
 Master Arun
 M. N. Lakshmi Devi as Anusuya, Gopi's mother
 R. T. Rama as Padma

Soundtrack 
The music was composed by Vijaya Bhaskar with lyrics by R. N. Jayagopal. All the songs composed for the film were received extremely well and considered as evergreen songs.

References

External links 
 

1972 films
1970s Kannada-language films
Indian romantic drama films
Indian black-and-white films
Films based on short fiction
Films scored by Vijaya Bhaskar
Kannada films remade in other languages
1972 romantic drama films
Films directed by R. N. Jayagopal